The 1884 United States presidential election in Indiana took place on November 4, 1884, as part of the 1884 United States presidential election. Voters chose 15 representatives, or electors to the Electoral College, who voted for president and vice president.

Indiana voted for the Democratic nominee, Grover Cleveland over the Republican nominee, James G. Blaine. Cleveland won the state by a narrow margin of 1.31%.

Results

See also
 United States presidential elections in Indiana

References

Indiana
1884
1884 Indiana elections